Nonacris or Nonakris was a town of ancient Arcadia in the territory of Orchomenus. With Dipoena and Calliae, it formed the Arcadian Tripolis. Its population was translated to the newly formed city of Megalopolis upon the foundation of the latter city in 371 BCE.

References

Populated places in ancient Arcadia
Former populated places in Greece
Lost ancient cities and towns